"I'll Be Alright Without You" is a song by the American rock band Journey included on their 9th studio album, Raised on Radio. 
The song was written and composed by Jonathan Cain, Steve Perry, and Neal Schon.

Chart performance
"I'll Be Alright Without You" reached #14 on the Billboard Hot 100 and peaked at #7 on the Adult Contemporary chart. On the Mainstream Rock chart, it peaked at #26.

References 

1986 singles
Journey (band) songs
Columbia Records singles